Vyborg Synagogue was the synagogue of the Jewish community in Vyborg. It was completed in 1910 as the town was a part of Grand Duchy of Finland. Vyborg Synagogue was one of the three synagogues ever built in Finland.

Original design was made by Finnish architect Gerhard Sohlberg in 1905 and the synagogue was built in 1909–1910 after some modifications by construction engineer Viktor Riihelä. It was completely destroyed by Soviet air bombings on the first day of Winter War, 30 November 1939.

See also

References 

Synagogues in Finland
Destroyed synagogues
Buildings and structures in Vyborg
Ashkenazi synagogues
Ashkenazi Jewish culture in Finland
Winter War
Synagogues completed in 1910
1910 establishments in Finland
Buildings and structures demolished in 1939
Religious organizations disestablished in 1939
1939 disestablishments in Finland
1939 disestablishments in the Soviet Union
National Romantic architecture in Finland
Art Nouveau synagogues